Marek Wielgus (20 December 1950 – 6 February 1996) was a Polish sports activist, photographer, and Sejm deputy on his second-term.

Biography 

Wielgus graduated from the School of Artistic Crafts in Warsaw in 1970. In the 1980s, he worked with the "Sportowiec" magazine and published the "Mecz" (Match) magazine. Wielgus was involved in sports photography, participating in the FIFA World Cup four times. Wielgus founded the first Laboratory of Professional Photography in Poland. He published several photo albums and organized exhibitions of his own works. From 1993 to 1996, he was the owner of the football section Polonia Warsaw and served as the chairman of its supervisory board.

In the 1991 Polish parliamentary election, Wielgus unsuccessfully competed as a nonpartisan candidate from the list Alliance of Democrats. In 1993 he was elected as a second-term deputy from the Nonpartisan Bloc for Support of Reforms. He directed the Youth Commission, Physical Culture and Sport in the Sejm. Wielgus, along with Lesław Ćmikiewicz were the first organizers of Students' Sports Clubs and the initiators of organizing mini football tournaments for children associated with UKS. In 1995 became the vice-president of the Polish Football Associations management board. After the breakup of the BBWR, Wielgus joined the Republican Party.

Wielgus along with parliament member Zbigniew Gorzelańczyk were killed in the 1996 crash of Birgenair Flight 301 in the Dominican Republic. He was posthumously awarded the Knight's Cross by the Order of Polonia Restituta.

In 1996 a commemorative plaque dedicated to Wielgus was placed on the Konwiktorska Street Municipal Stadium.

References

External links 

 Strona Turnieju im. Marka Wielgusa [Tournament website Marek Wielgus] 

1950 births
1996 deaths
Politicians from Warsaw
Photographers from Warsaw
Alliance of Democrats (Poland) politicians
Victims of aviation accidents or incidents in the Dominican Republic
Recipients of the Order of Polonia Restituta
Victims of aviation accidents or incidents in 1996